Cheremushki or Cheryomushki is the name of several inhabited localities in Russia.

Urban localities
Cheryomushki, Republic of Khakassia, a work settlement under the administrative jurisdiction of the Town of Sayanogorsk in the Republic of Khakassia

Rural localities
Cheremushki, Amur Oblast, a selo in Mukhinsky Rural Settlement of Oktyabrsky District in Amur Oblast
Cheryomushki, Bryansk Oblast (or Cheremushki), a settlement in Klyukovensky Rural Administrative Okrug of Navlinsky District in Bryansk Oblast; 
Cheremushki, Chelyabinsk Oblast, a settlement in Lazurnensky Selsoviet of Krasnoarmeysky District in Chelyabinsk Oblast
Cheremushki, Chuvash Republic, a settlement in Atnarskoye Rural Settlement of Krasnochetaysky District in the Chuvash Republic
Cheremushki, Irkutsk Oblast, a village in Irkutsky District of Irkutsk Oblast
Cheremushki, Kemerovo Oblast, a settlement in Shcheglovskaya Rural Territory of Kemerovsky District in Kemerovo Oblast; 
Cheremushki, Krasnoyarsk Krai, a settlement in Cheremushkinsky Selsoviet of Balakhtinsky District in Krasnoyarsk Krai
Cheremushki, Kurgan Oblast, a selo in Cheremushkinsky Selsoviet of Lebyazhyevsky District in Kurgan Oblast; 
Cheryomushki, Kursk Oblast, a settlement in Lebyazhensky Selsoviet of Kursky District in Kursk Oblast
Cheremushki, Lipetsk Oblast, a selo in Stebayevsky Selsoviet of Lipetsky District in Lipetsk Oblast; 
Cheremushki, Gorodetsky District, Nizhny Novgorod Oblast, a village in Zinyakovsky Selsoviet of Gorodetsky District in Nizhny Novgorod Oblast
Cheremushki, Varnavinsky District, Nizhny Novgorod Oblast, a settlement in Voskhodovsky Selsoviet of Varnavinsky District in Nizhny Novgorod Oblast
Cheremushki, Orenburg Oblast, a settlement in Iskrinsky Selsoviet of Abdulinsky District in Orenburg Oblast
Cheremushki, Samara Oblast, a village in Klyavlinsky District of Samara Oblast
Cheremushki, Saratov Oblast, a khutor in Pitersky District of Saratov Oblast
Cheremushki, Smolensk Oblast, a village in Polyanovskoye Rural Settlement of Vyazemsky District in Smolensk Oblast
Cheremushki, Tomsk Oblast, a settlement in Chainsky District of Tomsk Oblast
Cheremushki, Tula Oblast, a village in Rusinskaya Rural Administration of Chernsky District in Tula Oblast
Cheremushki, Bezhetsky District, Tver Oblast, a village in Porechyevskoye Rural Settlement of Bezhetsky District in Tver Oblast
Cheremushki, Oleninsky District, Tver Oblast, a settlement in Glazkovskoye Rural Settlement of Oleninsky District in Tver Oblast
Cheremushki, Staritsky District, Tver Oblast, a village in Stepurinskoye Rural Settlement of Staritsky District in Tver Oblast
Cheremushki, Tyumen Oblast, a village in Berkutsky Rural Okrug of Yalutorovsky District in Tyumen Oblast
Cheremushki, Udmurt Republic, a selo in Cheremushkinsky Selsoviet of Mozhginsky District in the Udmurt Republic
Cheremushki, Ulyanovsk Oblast, a selo in Cheremushkinsky Rural Okrug of Inzensky District in Ulyanovsk Oblast
Cheremushki, Vologda Oblast, a village in Naumovsky Selsoviet of Verkhovazhsky District in Vologda Oblast
Cheremushki, Yaroslavl Oblast, a village in Arefinsky Rural Okrug of Rybinsky District in Yaroslavl Oblast